The Secretary of Transportation Outstanding Achievement Medal also known as the Department of Transportation Gold Medal is the highest honorary award of the United States Department of Transportation.

Appearance
The medal is 1 3/8 inches in diameter, made of gold plated red brass.  The obverse depicts a triskelion superimposed over a graticule surrounded by a laurel wreath.  The reverse bears the words, in relief, DEPARTMENT OF TRANSPORTATION arched above with the incuse inscription OUTSTANDING ACHIEVEMENT on a scroll below.  In the middle are the words AWARDED TO with a space to engrave the recipient's name.  The medal is suspended from a ribbon 1 3/8 inches wide made up of a mirrored pattern with a center stripe of old glory blue, a stripe of white with a thin stripes of paprika and black, followed by another stripe of white next to a thin stripe of black with an edge stripe of paprika.

See also
Awards and decorations of the United States government

References

External links
COMDTINST M1650.25D Medals and Awards Manual page 22-1.
COMDTINST M12451.1B Coast Guard Civilian Awards Manual, page 3-1.

Awards and decorations of the United States Coast Guard
United States Department of Transportation